Glenea x-nigrum is a species of beetle in the family Cerambycidae. It was described by Per Olof Christopher Aurivillius in 1913 and is known from Java.

References

x-nigrum
Beetles described in 1913